Ethics of justice, also known as morality of justice, is the term used by Carol Gilligan in In a Different Voice to describe the ethics and moral reasoning common to men and preferred by Kohlberg's stages of moral development. The ethics of justice deals with moral choices through a measure of rights of the people involved and chooses the solution that seems to damage the fewest people. Rooted in a respect for the legal system, it applies in the Western democracy ideas like social contract theory to everyday moral decisions.

References

Developmental psychology
Ethics